Qaed-e Ebrahimi (also Romanized as Qāed-e Ebrāhīmī; also known as Qāedī) is a village in Baghak Rural District, in the Central District of Tangestan County, Bushehr Province, Iran. At the 2006 census, its population was 38, in 9 families.

References 

Populated places in Tangestan County